Sainte Partners II, L.P. (also known as Sainte Television Group) was a broadcast company based in Modesto, California.  The company's founder was country-western performer Chester Smith and his wife Naomi.

Stations previously owned by Sainte
 KCSO-LD Telemundo 33 (Sacramento), now owned by NBCUniversal
 KFBI-LD My 48 MyNetworkTV, This TV 48.2 (Medford), now owned by Imagicomm Communications
 KMCW-LP Telemundo 14 (Medford), now owned by Imagicomm Communications
 KVIQ CBS 17 (Eureka), now owned by Imagicomm Communications
 KCVU Fox 20 (Chico) & KBVU Fox 28 (Eureka), now owned by Cunningham Broadcasting, operated by Sinclair Broadcast Group
 MyTV Northern California (Chico/Eureka), now owned by Sinclair Broadcast Group
 KUCO-LP Univision 27 (Chico), now owned by Sinclair Broadcast Group
 KXVU-LD Telemundo 17 (Chico), now owned by Sinclair Broadcast Group
 KKTF-LD Telefutura 30 (Chico), now owned by Sinclair Broadcast Group
 KUVU-LP CW (Eureka) (Now KECA-LD), now owned by Sinclair Broadcast Group

Death of Chester Smith
The Sacramento Bee and Chico Enterprise Record have both reported that Chester Smith, founder of Sainte Partners, died on August 8, 2008, at Stanford Medical Center in Palo Alto, California at age 78.  He is survived by his second wife Ann and three daughters.

References

Defunct television broadcasting companies of the United States
Companies based in Stanislaus County, California
Mass media companies disestablished in 2014